The National Union was a Fascist political party in Switzerland between 1932 and 1945. It was mainly active in the canton of Geneva.

History
 
The party was founded in Geneva in 1932 by lawyer and writer Georges Oltramare. Noted for his anti-semitic writing, Oltramare had founded the Ordre politique nationale in 1930, which merged with the Union de défense économique, founded in 1923, to form the National Union. Oltramare spent four years as a member of the Federal Assembly of Switzerland representing the National Union. It became notorious for a demonstration in Geneva on November 9, 1932 when their march to the city's Salle Communale was counterdemonstrated by the Swiss Socialist Party. In the ensuing trouble, the Swiss army opened fire on the Socialists resulting in 13 deaths.

The National Union was the Swiss political movement most closely associated with Italian fascism. It demanded the reduction of public spending and taxes, and opposed any new naturalization and social welfare for non-Genevans (welfare chauvinism). It gained ten seats in the Grand Council of Geneva in the 1936 cantonal election.

The group began to decline by the late 1930s. In 1940, Oltramare left the party's leadership when he moved to German-occupied Paris in order to co-operate more closely with the Nazis. The party dissolved in 1945.

References 

Defunct political parties in Switzerland
Fascist parties
Political parties established in 1932
Political parties disestablished in 1945
1932 establishments in Switzerland
1940s disestablishments in Switzerland